Delafield is a city in Waukesha County, Wisconsin, along the Bark River. The population was 7,085 at the 2010 census.

The city of Delafield is a separate municipality from the Town of Delafield, both of which are situated in township 7 North Range 18 East.

History
Delafield was established in 1837, named after Dr. Charles Delafield of Milwaukee. It was the hometown of the Cushing brothers, who served the Union cause during the American Civil War—Alonzo (killed during Pickett's Charge at Gettysburg), William (led the raid on ), and Howard (an Indian fighter killed fighting the Apache in Arizona after the war). Cushing Memorial Park is named after them and is home to a war memorial in their honor, and Cushing Elementary is specifically named after Alonzo Cushing. Recently a poll was done in the city of Delafield about the legalization of recreational marijuana. The poll showed that 40% approved legalization, 40% did not want legalization, and 20% were undecided. Since 1927, a culinary event known as the "Coon Feed" has taken  place in Delafield.

Geography
Delafield is located in the Lake Country area of Waukesha County.

Demographics

2010 census
As of the census of 2010, there were 7,085 people, 2,776 households, and 1,858 families living in the city. The racial makeup of the city was 96.4% White, 0.8% African American, 0.3% Native American, 1.3% Asian, 0.4% from other races, and 0.8% from two or more races. Hispanic or Latino of any race were 3.2% of the population.

There were 2,776 households, of which 29.7% had children under the age of 18 living with them, 56.3% were married couples living together, 7.0% had a female householder with no husband present, 3.6% had a male householder with no wife present, and 33.1% were non-families. Some 26.8% of all households were made up of individuals, and 11.2% had someone living alone who was 65 years of age or older. The average household size was 2.38 and the average family size was 2.92.

The median age in the city was 41.8 years. Around 25.2% of residents were under the age of 18; 7.6% were between the ages of 18 and 24; 21.8% were from 25 to 44; 32.4% were from 45 to 64; and 13% were 65 years of age or older. The gender makeup of the city was 50.9% male and 49.1% female.

2000 census
As of the census of 2000, there were 6,472 people, 2,553 households, and 1,856 families living in the city. The population density was 680.2 people per square mile (262.5/km2). There were 2,685 housing units at an average density of 282.2 per square mile (108.9/km2). The racial makeup of the city was 97.74% White, 9% Black or African American, 0.31% Native American, 0.57% Asian, 0.32% from other races, and 0.96% from two or more races. Some 1.47% of the population were Hispanic or Latino of any race.

There were 2,553 households, out of which 35.8% had children under the age of 18 living with them. Around 61.7% were married couples living together, 8.0% had a female householder with no husband present, and 27.3% were non-families. About 22.2% of all households were made up of individuals, and 7.7% had someone living alone who was 65 years of age or older. The average household size was 2.52 and the average family size was 2.97.

In the city, the population was spread out, with 26.6% under the age of 18, 5.7% from 18 to 24, 29.8% from 25 to 44, 27.1% from 45 to 64, and 10.8% who were 65 years of age or older. The median age was 39 years. For every 100 females, there were 98.5 males. For every 100 females age 18 and over, there were 93.3 males.

The median income for a household in the city was $61,938, and the median income for a family was $71,955. Males had a median income of $51,656 versus $30,253 for females. The per capita income for the city was $31,602. About 2.3% of families and 3.4% of the population were below the poverty line, including 5.3% of those under age 18 and 1.4% of those age 65 or over.

Education
The Kettle Moraine School District serves most of Delafield. Cushing Elementary provides education for children from kindergarten through 5th grade. St. John's Northwestern Military Academy, a private Episcopal military school for 7th through 12th grade, is also located in Delafield.

Notable people

Alonzo Cushing, U.S. Army, Medal of Honor recipient
William B. Cushing, U.S. Navy, Recipient of Thanks of Congress
Cindi Duchow, Wisconsin State Assembly
Monte Merkel, NFL player
Sankar Montoute, NFL player
Alex Moyer, NFL player
James Kerr Proudfit, Adjutant General of Wisconsin
Alex Rigsby, woman's ice hockey player
Ralph H. Spanjer, U.S. Marine Corps Major General
George Wilson, NFL player, assistant coach and head coach
Chuck Wepfer, lead guitarist of Blacktop Mojo and national recording artist

References

External links

 City of Delafield
 Sanborn fire insurance map: 1903

Cities in Wisconsin
Cities in Waukesha County, Wisconsin